This is a list of notable Chinese Australians.

Academia
 Terence Tao: FRS, Fields Medal winner
 Wang Gungwu: AO CBE, historian, Vice-Chancellor of Hong Kong University (1988–1995), President of the Australian Academy of the Humanities (1980–1983)
 Liangchi Zhang: professor of engineering, University of New South Wales
 Chin Liew Ten (C. L. Ten): FAHA FASSA, Emeritus Professor of Philosophy and former Head, Philosophy Department, National University of Singapore
 Mabel Lee: literary scholar and translator
 Xiaokai Yang: economist
 Jenny Zhang: chemist, BBSRC David Phillips Fellow at the Department of Chemistry, University of Cambridge

Politics

Federal Parliament
 Sam Lim: Federal Member for Tangney (Labor, 2022–present)
 Gladys Liu: Federal Member for Chisholm (Liberal, 2019–2022)
 Sally Sitou: Federal Member for Reid (Labor, 2022–present)
 Tsebin Tchen: Federal Senator for Victoria (Liberal, 1999–2005)
 Dio Wang: Federal Senator for Western Australia (Palmer United, 2014–2016)

State and Territory Parliaments
 Helen Sham-Ho OAM: Liberal Member of the Legislative Council of New South Wales (State Parliament) 1988–2003
 Peter Wong AM: Member of the Legislative Council of New South Wales (State Parliament), 1999–2007; Founder, Unity Party (Australia), 1998
 Michael Choi: Labor Member of the Queensland Legislative Assembly (State Parliament), 2001–2012
 Jing Lee MLC: Liberal Member of the Legislative Council of South Australia since 2010 (State Parliament) 
 Ernest Wong, Labor MLC: Member of the Legislative Council of New South Wales 2013–2019 (State Parliament)
 Hong Lim: MP: Labor Member of the Legislative Assembly of Victoria 1996–2018
 Bernice Pfitzner: MLC: Liberal Member of the Legislative Council of South Australia, 1990–1997
 Pierre Yang: Member of the Western Australian Legislative Council: Labor member for Electoral region of South Metropolitan since 2017
 Jack Ah Kit: Labor member for Arnhem in the Northern Territory Legislative Assembly from 1995 to 2005.
 Jenny Leong: Member of the New South Wales Legislative Assembly representing Newtown for the Greens since 2015
 Ngaree Ah Kit: Labor member for Karama in the Northern Territory Legislative Assembly since 2016
 Geoff Lee: member of the New South Wales Legislative Assembly representing Parramatta for the Liberal Party since 2011

Local Government
 Henry Tsang OAM: Parliamentary Secretary to the Premier; Deputy Lord Mayor, Sydney, 1991–1999
 John So AO: Lord Mayor of Melbourne, 2001–2008
 Harry Chan: First Chinese mayor of Australia, Darwin
 Alec Fong Lim AM: Lord Mayor of Darwin, 1984–1990
 Katrina Fong Lim: Lord Mayor of Darwin, 2012-2017
 Wellington Lee AM OBE: Deputy Lord Mayor of Melbourne, 1999–2000
 Jennifer Yang: Mayor of Manningham, 2015–2016

Other Politics
 William Ah Ket: barrister and early 20th century campaigner for Chinese rights

Military
 Jack Wong Sue OAM: World War II special forces soldier, Borneo campaign, post-war businessman, and author

Religion
 Greg Homeming: Catholic bishop
 Ivan Lee: Anglican bishop

Business
 Wong Ah Sat: gold digger, farmer, and merchant
 Xu Rongmao: billionaire, AFR rich lister, chairman and founder, Hong Kong-based Shimao Property
 David Teoh: billionaire, AFR rich lister, former chairman and founder, TPG (ISP)
 Chau Chak Wing: billionaire, AFR rich lister, Guangzhou-based property developer
 Marita Cheng: founder of Robogals and 2012 Young Australian of the Year
 Kwong Sue Duk: pioneer herbalist and merchant
 Chin Kaw: Tasmanian herbalist, merchant, and mining entrepreneur
 Neale Fong: doctor and sports administrator
 Stern Hu: businessman
 Bing Lee: businessman who started up the Bing Lee franchises
 Andrew Leon: businessman in Cairns, Queensland 
 Lum Loy: Darwin businessperson
 Yew-Kwang Ng: economist at Monash University
 Trevor O'Hoy: former CEO of Foster's Group
 Tom See Poy: department store owner in Innisfail, Queensland
 Mei Quong Tart: 19th Century businessman and public figurehead
 David Wang: businessman
 Jack Zhang: founder and CEO of Airwallex

Sport
 Catriona Bisset: middle-distance athlete
 Richard Chee Quee: cricketer
 William Cheung:  kung Fu practitioner
 Jian Fang Lay: table tennis player
 Les Fong: Australian rules footballer
 Kevin Gordon: rugby league player
 Priscilla Hon: tennis player
 Lin Jong: Australian rules footballer
 Cheltzie Lee: figure skater
 Anthony Liu: figure skater
 Miao Miao: table tennis player
 Anne Pang: kung fu practitioner 
 Barry Pang: kung fu practitioner and Horse racing. First Chinese Australian to own a winner of the Melbourne Cup. 
 Hunter Poon: first player of Chinese descent to appear in Australian first-class cricket
 Esther Qin: diver
 Dannie Seow: Australian rules footballer
 Kenneth To: swimmer
 Jack Wunhym: Australian rules footballer

Medicine
 Victor Chang AC: heart surgeon
 Cindy Pan: celebrity doctor and sexual/women's health expert
 John Yu AC: paediatrician and 1996 Australian of the Year
 Charles Teo AM: neurosurgeon

Media and the arts

 Tony Ayres: screenwriter and director
 Jason Chan: actor and director
 Queenie Chan: comic artist
 Claudia Chan Shaw: fashion designer and television presenter
 Aaron Chen: comedian
 Lee Lin Chin: news reader
 Elizabeth Chong AM: chef, author and television presenter
 Anna Choy: actress and presenter
 Li Cunxin AO: ballet dancer, author and public speaker
 Jeff Fatt AM: musician
 Alexander Hodge: actor
 Russell Jack AM: founder and director of the Golden Dragon Museum
 Shen Jiawei: painter
 Kylie Kwong: chef, restaurateur and media presenter
 Lawrence Leung: comedian
 Guang Li: actor
 Renee Lim: actress and media personality
 Nina Liu: actress
 Helene Chung Martin: former ABC correspondent and author 
 Jaymee Ong: actress and model
 Natalie Ong: singer, season 8 finalist of The X-Factor Australia
 Cindy Pan: physician and media personality
 Chris Pang: actor
 Alice Pung: author
 Rose Quong: actor, performer and writer
 Sarah Song: television actress and presenter
 Shaun Tan: artist, author and illustrator
 Ling-Hsueh Tang: actress
 Vico Thai: television and film actor
 Annette Shun Wah: media presenter
 James Wan: film director, writer, and producer of the Saw film franchise
 Poh Ling Yeow: artist, grand finalist on MasterChef Australia 2009
 John Zerunge Young AM: artist

 Courtney Eaton: actress and model
 Richard Clapton: singer-songwriter
 Jimmy Chi: composer, musician and playwright
 Lisa Ho: fashion designer
 Jenny Kee AO: fashion designer
 Adam Liaw: winner of MasterChef Australia 2010
 Shaun Tan: artist, writer and film maker. He won an Academy Award for The Lost Thing
 Wong Shee Ping (c. 1875–1948): author of The Poison of Polygamy, political activist
 Bin Xie: painter
 Yang Hengjun: political blogger, author of Fatal Weakness series
 Ouyang Yu: poet, novelist and author of The Eastern Slope Chronicle
 TwoSet Violin: YouTube violinist duo made up of Brett Yang and Eddy Chen
 Margaret Zhang: filmmaker, writer, model, creative director, and Editor in Chief of Vogue China

Other
 James Chung Gon: community leader

References